Cerceris yuwanensis is a species of wasp in the family Crabronidae. It is found in Japan.

References

External links

Crabronidae
Insects described in 1982